Mervyn Archdall ( – 18 June 1813) of Castle Archdale, Enniskillen, County Fermanagh and Trilleck, County Tyrone was a British High Sheriff and Member of Parliament.

He was born the only son of Nicholas Archdall (formerly Montgomery) of Derrygonnelly, County Fermanagh and his first wife Angel, the daughter and heiress of William Archdall of Castle Archdall. He was educated at Trinity College, Dublin and studied law at Lincoln's Inn in London. He succeeded his mother in 1745 and his father in 1763.

He was Governor of Fermanagh in 1756 and served as a member of the Parliament of Ireland for Fermanagh from 1761 to 1800. He was High Sheriff of Fermanagh for 1773 to 1774.

After the Acts of Union he was a co-opted MP in the first Parliament of the United Kingdom for County Fermanagh from 1801 to 1802, after which he handed the seat to his son and heir, Mervyn Archdall (junior).

He married in 1762 the Hon. Mary Dawson, daughter of William Henry, 1st Viscount Carlow, and with her had four sons and eight daughters. In 1773 to 1778 he rebuilt Castle Archdale, which had been burned in the uprising of 1689 to 1690.

References

1720s births
1813 deaths
Alumni of Trinity College Dublin
Members of Lincoln's Inn
Members of the Parliament of Ireland (pre-1801) for County Fermanagh constituencies
Members of the Parliament of the United Kingdom for County Fermanagh constituencies (1801–1922)
High Sheriffs of County Fermanagh
UK MPs 1801–1802
Dawson-Damer family